Robert Bălăeț (born 18 November 1974) is a Romanian retired footballer who played as a goalkeeper.

After retiring from his career as a professional footballer, he worked as a sports director at CS Pandurii Lignitul Târgu Jiu between 2009 and 2015 and for another half year in 2017.

He is currently the director of the CSM Târgu Jiu, a position he has held since 20 March 2019.

External links
 

1974 births
Living people
Sportspeople from Târgu Jiu
Romanian footballers
Association football goalkeepers
Liga I players
Liga II players
CS Pandurii Târgu Jiu players